"Repeat" is a song by French DJ David Guetta, featuring vocals from British recording artist Jessie J. Written by Jessie J, The Invisible Men, Ali Tennant, David Guetta, Giorgio Tuinfort, Frédéric Riesterer and produced by Guetta, Tuinfort, Riesterer, the song has thus far peaked at number 108 in UK Singles Chart.

Musically, "Repeat" is a mid-tempo pop song, with lyrics that feature Jessie dancing to the beat. Music critics positively reviewed the song, praising Jessie's vocal performance.

Background 
Written by Jessie J, The Invisible Men, Ali Tennant, David Guetta, Giorgio Tuinfort, Frédéric Riesterer and produced by Guetta. This song features the vocals of English singer-songwriter Jessie J.

Critical reception 

Scott Shetler of PopCrush said: "Guetta wisely avoids the synth loops on the mid-tempo track 'Repeat' and instead lets Jessie J show off her voice: "I wanna know was I the one, or just the chick on the side? / I gave it all, broke it down my walls, don't you dare say I didn't try." An infectious hook makes 'Repeat' one of the most fun-sounding breakup songs we can remember." Digital Spy's Robert Copsey gave a review: "A combination of a chill melody, emotional vocals, and a more progressive tune make this a first for Guetta. "Repeat" reminds us a little of "When Love Takes Over", not as big room but same sort of transition. While the vocals of Jessie J are pleasant, they don't lead us to believe that this will be any sort of genre transcending track."

Chart performance 
In the United Kingdom, "Repeat" peaked at number 108 on the UK Singles Chart on 9 October 2011. It also charted on the Europe Top 100, where it peaked at number sixty-nine.

Credits and personnel 
Credits adapted from the album's liner notes.

 Jessica Cornish - songwriting and lead vocals
 The Invisible Men - songwriter
 Ali Tennant - songwriter
 David Guetta - songwriter, production and all instruments
 Giorgio Tuinfortt - songwriter, producer
 Frédéric Riesterer - songwriter, producer

Charts

Release history

References

2011 singles
David Guetta songs
Jessie J songs
Songs written by David Guetta
Songs written by Jessie J
Songs written by Giorgio Tuinfort
Songs written by Frédéric Riesterer
2011 songs
Virgin Records singles
EMI Records singles
Songs written by Jason Pebworth
Songs written by George Astasio
Songs written by Jon Shave
Songs written by Ali Tennant
Song recordings produced by David Guetta